Francesco Curradi or Currado (15 November 1570 – 1661) was an Italian painter of the style described as Counter-Maniera or Counter-Mannerism, born and active in Florence.

Biography
Curradi was the son of a jeweller, Taddeo. He trained under Giovanni Battista Naldini and in 1590 matriculated in the Accademia del Disegno, Florence. His first independent works from 1597 to 1598 were for churches in Volterra, including that in the Colleoni chapel of the local Duomo. He helped paint the frescoes of the Fame Exalting Michelangelo (c. 1616–1617) for the Casa Buonarroti.

In 1622 he painted the St Francis Xavier preaching in India for the church of San Giovannino degli Scolopi in Florence, and a canvas of Narcissus and Herminia among shepherds commissioned by the cardinal Carlo de' Medici for his Casino di San Marco. He also executed seven lunettes in the chapel of Villa del Poggio Imperiale with the Story of Mary Magdalen. Curradi painted the Crowning of the Virgin in 1646 for the Benedictine Abbey of Vallombrosa, and a Preaching of John the Baptist for the Rondoni chapel in the church of Santa Trinita in 1649. The Uffizi has two paintings: a Martyrdom of Santa Tecla and a Beatification of the Magdalen.

One of his pupils was Cesare Dandini.

References

 Grove Art Dictionary

1570 births
1661 deaths
16th-century Italian painters
Italian male painters
17th-century Italian painters
Painters from Florence
Italian Renaissance painters
Mannerist painters